Catherine Samary born in 1945,  is a French researcher in political economy, specialized on the former Yugoslavia and Eastern Europe. She received her Phd in economics in 1986 : her thesis on the contradictory logics of the reforms in the Yugoslav self-management system was published in 1988 under the title « Le Marché contre l’autogestion - l’expérience yougoslave » (The Market against Self-management : the Yugoslav expérience) with a preface from Ernest Mandel (Ed. Publidsud/LaBrèche).

She was until her retirement a lecturer at the Paris, Dauphine University. She is a regular lecturer at the International Institute for Research and Education, in Amsterdam.https://www.iire.org/index.php/fr/node/9 .

As a researcher she is involved in the network of the French Association for Balkan Studies (AFEbalk) and its Review Balkanologie. https://journals.openedition.org/balkanologie/ to which she contributes https://search.openedition.org/results?q=%22Catherine+Samary%22&s=Balkanologie&pf=OJ

She wrote in French several books, essays and articles on the Yugoslav experience  (among which has been translated into English Yugoslavia Dismembered (translated by Peter Drucker, Monthly Review Press, New York, 1995) (ISBN 0853459215). She developed  comparative analysis of the different experiences and reforms  of the Soviet planning system (see, for example Plan, Market and Democracy - the experience of the so-called socialist countries https://fileserver.iire.org/nsr/NSR7.pdf - An independent website has produced a shorten version of this essay in 2018. http://www.socialisteconomist.com/2018/01/neither-capitalist-nor-socialist.html)

Samary put emphasis on specific phases of democratic mass movements in those countries (like in 1968 in Czechoslovakia or later in Poland) compared to their socio-economic transformations through the capitalist restoration after 1989 (see in particular her contributions for  Le Monde Diplomatique, in French : https://www.monde-diplomatique.fr/recherche?s=%22Catherine+Samary%22 ; in English : https://mondediplo.com/search?s=%22Catherine+Samary%22)

She is member of the scientific council of the French Attac and of the editorial board of its Review Les Possibles ; founding member of the Association Autogestion (self-management) and of the European Network in solidarity with Ukraine https://ukraine-solidarity.eu. She has been involved in its delegations to Ukraine in relation with the left political, tradeunionist and feminist networks https://ukraine-solidarity.eu/47c3dc85f6ed4f18a588ac303812e559

In 1973 she joined the Fourth International (https://fourth.international) ; and she is member of its broad international leadership body, the International Committee. She was a co-founder of what was for many years its largest section, the Revolutionary Communist League.

She contributed a chapter of the book (coordinated by Gilbert Achcar, in French and English) about The Legacy of Ernest Mandel : « Mandel’s concepts on socialism » ( https://www.europe-solidaire.org/spip.php?article2807 ).

She was actively involved in actions and debates against the French law which in 2004 excluded from the public schools Muslim girls wearing the scarf. She has produced a balance sheet of three years of conflicts on that issue, published by the website « Les mots sont importants » (words are importants) under the title « Au-delà du voile et de la laïcité » (beyond the scarf and laicity) : https://lmsi.net/Au-dela-du-voile-et-de-la-laicite. Samary's analysis on the French laicity « as not anti-religious » was also, published in Switzerland by the Review and website SolidaritéS. ( https://solidarites.ch/journal/128-2/la-laicite-nest-pas-anti-religieuse/ ) and in Spanish by the Review Viento Sur  https://cdn.vientosur.info/VScompletos/VIENTOSUR-numero96-06-LosRetosdelaInmigracion-Laicidad-CatherineSamary.pdf

She is a regular contributor to the reviews Contretemps ( https://www.contretemps.eu/author/catherine-samary/ ),  Inprecor, International Viewpoint, VientoSur.

On her website, can be found numerous videos (in French and often in English) of presentation of her analysis http://csamary.fr/videos.html  ; and a chronological presentation of her publications according to four main themes: questions and experiences of socialism; capitalist restoration; world disorder; alternatives http://csamary.fr/rubriques.html

Her book, written in the context of the anniversary of October Revolution, in 2017,  D'un communisme décolonial à la démocratie des communs published by Editions Le Croquant in French is now available in pdf  https://editions-croquant.org/livres-numeriques/445-pdf-dun-communisme-decolonial-a-la-democratie-des-communs.html The book presents the Yugoslav experience  as a break with Stalin's orientation. And it is revisited in the context of the ongoing debates on the commons. Its extended version in English (co-edited with Fred Leplat)  was published under the title Decolonial Communism: Democracy and the Commons. Published by Resistance Books, Merlin Press and the IIRE, 2019.

References

External links
 Catherine Samary's website
 Catherine Samary's profile at the International Institute for Research and Education

Year of birth missing (living people)
Living people
University of Paris alumni
French Trotskyists
Revolutionary Communist League (France) politicians